The 1957 NCAA Swimming and Diving Championships  were contested in March 1957 at the Bowman Gray Pool at the University of North Carolina in Chapel Hill, North Carolina at the 21st annual NCAA-sanctioned swim meet to determine the team and individual national champions of men's collegiate swimming and diving in the United States. 

Michigan regained the national title, the Wolverines' seventh (and first since 1948), after finishing eight points ahead of Yale in the team standings.

Program changes
One new event, the 400-yard medley relay, was added to the NCAA championships program this year.

Team results
Note: Top 10 only
(H) = Hosts
Full results

See also
List of college swimming and diving teams

References

NCAA Division I Men's Swimming and Diving Championships
NCAA Swimming And Diving Championships
NCAA Swimming And Diving Championships
NCAA Swimming And Diving Championships